Bikini Airways is a 2003 American made for cable erotic film written and directed by Fred Olen Ray (under the pseudonym name Nicholas Juan Medina).

Plot
Terri (Regina Russell), after inheriting an airline from her late uncle (and the debt that goes with it), gets a wealthy oil tycoon to pony up 25,000 to have his bachelor party on her first flight.

Background
The film was produced by the production company American Independent Productions and distributed by Retromedia Entertainment. It was broadcast several times in the winter of 2003 at fixed times and on demand on the premium channels Cinemax and Showtime.

Ray said he made the film "on a lark and it did really well". It ushered in a series of bikini films.

Reception
The film was given 2.5 out of 4 by Dr. Gore's Movie Reviews. It was also rated 8 out of 10 by Tarstarkas.net.

References

External links

2003 television films
2003 films
American erotic films
Films directed by Fred Olen Ray
2000s erotic films
2000s English-language films
2000s American films